Jürgen Raeymaeckers (born 3 May 1985) is a Belgian football striker who currently plays for K. Lyra T.S.V. in the lower leagues of Belgian football. Before he played with both Lierse and Roeselare in the Belgian Pro League.

Career
The winger/forward began his professional career with Lierse in 2004, scoring two times in 45 matches, before moving to Roeselare in 2006. As he did not get into the first team there, he left in 2007 to Belgian Second Division team OH Leuven. He left Leuven already few months later and moved to Sint-Niklaas in the Belgian Third Division. At Sint-Niklaas he was a regular, playing 52 matches in total. In 2010, he moved to Lille and afterwards Zwarte Leeuw.

References

1985 births
Living people
Belgian footballers
Lierse S.K. players
K.S.V. Roeselare players
Oud-Heverlee Leuven players
Belgian Pro League players
Challenger Pro League players

Association football forwards
Sportkring Sint-Niklaas players